Step It Up and Dance is an American reality television competition series where contestants are supposed to "learn what it takes to make it big in the cutthroat dance industry". Actress and dancer Elizabeth Berkley serves as host, and director and choreographer Jerry Mitchell mentors the 12 dancers chosen from around the country as they learn a variety of dance styles. Director and choreographer Vincent Paterson and choreographer Nancy O'Meara serve as judges for the competition.

The show premiered on April 3, 2008 on Bravo.

Contestants

(in order of elimination)
Nicole Berrong, 29, from Farmington Hills, MI - Withdrew 
Adriana Falcon, 25, from Shrewsbury, MA 
James Alsop, 23, from Charlotte, NC 
Jessica Feltman, 22, from San Luis Obispo, CA - Withdrew 
Tovah Collins, 21, from Chicago, IL 
Michael Silas, 24, from Houston, TX
Oscar Campisi, 31 from Bologna, Italy
Janelle Ginestra, 18, from Modesto, CA 
Miguel Zarate, 24, from Delano, CA
Nick Drago, 26, from Houston, TX
Michelle "Mochi" Camaya, 30, from San Diego, CA
Cody Green, 27, from Surrey, Canada - Winner

Eliminations

:  The judges told Jessica that she would have been going home due to her performance had she had not been in the winning group.
:  The judges told Janelle that she would have been going home due to her performance had she not won immunity from the prior challenge.
:  The judges told Oscar that he would have been going home due to his performance had he not won immunity from the prior challenge.
:  For this challenge, Oscar won the right to return to the competition.  Also, the judges found it unfair to eliminate someone else after bringing back Oscar.  Therefore, no one else was eliminated.
:  Jessica and the other eliminated dancers were brought back for a shot to come back in this challenge.  However, she dropped out due to an inner ear infection, which meant Miguel danced as a solo.
:  Michelle's win is referred to the first performance to Fergie's song.

 Blue background and WIN means the dancer won that challenge.
 Red background and OUT means the dancer lost and was out of the competition.
 Light blue background and HIGH means the dancer had one of the highest ratings for that challenge.
 Pink background and LOW means the dancer had one of the lowest ratings and was in the bottom three for that challenge.
 Orange background and LOW means the dancer was in the bottom two for that challenge.
 Yellow background and WD means the dancer withdrew from the competition.

Episodes

Episode 1: A Scary Surprise 
The dancers arrive in Los Angeles and unknowingly begin the competition by dancing in a nightclub. Based on their performance in the nightclub, the dancers are divided into a winning group and losing group. Both groups perform in front of the judges, with one member of the winning group winning immunity for the next week and one member of the losing team going home. Both teams performed to the Spice Girls song, "Spice Up Your Life". Notable events include Jessica running off the stage during the winning group's performance, Adriana getting eliminated, and Nicole leaving the show due to an injury. Jessica was told that if she weren't on the winning team, she would be immediately eliminated.

PARTNERS:
Adriana and Cody
Janelle and James
Jessica and Michael
Michelle and Miguel
Nicole and Nick
Tovah and Oscar
Judges: Elizabeth Berkley, Vincent Paterson, Nancy O'Meara 
Guest Judges: Jamie King & Mel B
WINNER: Janelle
OUT: Adriana
WITHDRAWN: Nicole (due to an injury)
First aired April 3, 2008

Episode 2: Baring It All 
The dancers perform the French Apache. To separate the dancers into winning and losing groups, they had to demonstrate their skills with a partner while displaying the drama and character the dance requires. Notable highlights include Jessica redeeming herself, Janelle being told that immunity was the only thing that saved her elimination, and Michael is unanimously voted as the weakest link of the losing team but he still manages to make it through to the next challenge. At this point, Michelle is the only dancer to have been in the winning group both times.
PARTNERS:
Janelle and James
Michelle and Miguel
Janelle and Michael
Michelle and Oscar
Tovah and Nick
Jessica and Cody
Judges: Elizabeth Berkley, Vincent Paterson, Nancy O'Meara 
Guest Judges: Cati Jean, Carolina Cerisola
WINNER: Oscar
OUT: James
First aired April 10, 2008

Episode 3: Battle Zone 
The dancers are taught hip-hop techniques. After performing, guest judge Dave Scott selected three crew leaders based on their performance. After learning a routine, each team faced off against each other. After the face-offs, Red Everest was voted as the winning group, while Breakin Blues and BT Slam were the elimination groups.

PARTNERS:
Red Everest: Janelle, Michael, Tovah
Breakin Blues: Cody, Michelle, Jessica
BT Slam: Miguel, Nick, Oscar
Judges: Elizabeth Berkley, Vincent Paterson, Nancy O'Meara 
Guest Judges: Dave Scott & Robert Hoffman
WINNER: Janelle
OUT: Jessica
First aired April 17, 2008

Episode 4: Gotta Have Rhythm
The dancers learned stomp techniques from Luke Cresswell. The winning team performed a stomp routine with trash cans and the elimination team performed a stomp routine with brooms.

Judges: Elizabeth Berkley, Vincent Paterson, Nancy O'Meara 
Guest Judges: Luke Cresswell
WINNER: Miguel
OUT: Tovah
First aired April 24, 2008

Episode 5: Major League Broadway

PARTNERS:
Janelle and Michael
Michelle and Miguel
Nick and Cody
Judges: Elizabeth Berkley, Vincent Paterson, Nancy O'Meara 
Guest Judges: Jason Alexander, Lee Martino
WINNER: Cody
OUT: Oscar
First aired May 1, 2008

Episode 6: Modern Meltdown

Winning teams and elimination teams are no more as everyone is eligible for the win and the elimination. In the audition, two teams of three were formed. The first team consisted of Cody, Michelle, and Nick. The second team consisted of Janelle, Michael, and Miguel.  For the callback performance, the two teams had to create their own dance to Gwen Stefani's "The Sweet Escape".

Judges: Elizabeth Berkley, Vincent Paterson, Nancy O'Meara 
Guest Judges: Jacques Heim
WINNER: Cody
OUT: Michael
First aired May 8, 2008
 Cody is the First person to win 2 challenges in a row.

Episode 7: Perfect Partners
The eliminated competitors return to compete with those remaining in a Latin-themed dance.  As an added challenge, the judges inform the contestants that one of the eliminated dancers will have a chance to return to the show, potentially knocking someone else out of the competition. Notable highlights include Oscar returning and no one being eliminated.

Judges: Elizabeth Berkley, Vincent Paterson, Nancy O'Meara 
Guest Judges: Jordi Caballero
WINNER: Michelle
First aired May 15, 2008

Episode 8: Dancing in the Rain
The dancers have a lesson in music video choreography under the watchful eye of guest judge Tina Landon.  In the audition, contestants have to learn Landon's choreography for Rihanna's song "Umbrella".  For the callback performance, two teams (under the leadership of audition winners Nick and Cody) have to choreograph their own dance segments to coordinate with the dance they learned earlier.

Judges: Elizabeth Berkley, Vincent Paterson, Nancy O'Meara 
Guest Judges: Tina Landon
WINNER: Nick
OUT: Oscar (again)
First aired May 22, 2008

Episode 9: Finale, Part 1
The dancers are challenged to choreograph Michael Jackson's "Man in the Mirror".

Judges: Elizabeth Berkley, Vincent Paterson, Nancy O'Meara
Guest Judges: 
WINNER: Nick
OUT: Janelle
First aired 2008-05-29
 Nick is the 2nd person to win 2 challenges in a row behind Cody also from season 1.

Episode 10: Finale, Part 2
The dancers take part in a final challenge and perform their solos for the judges.

Challenge
Judges: Elizabeth Berkley, Vincent Paterson, Nancy O'Meara
Guest Judge: Akon
WINNER: Michelle
Group Song: "Labels Or Love" by Fergie
Finale
Judges: Elizabeth Berkley, Vincent Paterson, Nancy O'Meara
OVERALL WINNER: Cody
Solo Song: "It's Over" by TJ Moss
First aired 2008-06-05

Reception
The series premiere was Bravo's highest-rated in the 10PM time slot ever, with 826,000 viewers, among whom 574,000 were aged 18 to 49. The show continued to perform well throughout its run, averaging 756,000 viewers each week - of whom 522,000 were aged 18 to 49 - and helped contribute to Bravo's highest-rated April ever.

There has been no talk of a second season of the show - despite it performing well in the ratings - and its page has been removed from Bravo's website.
The series was officially canceled on April 14.

Footnotes

External links
 Official website
 

2000s American reality television series
2008 American television series debuts
2008 American television series endings
Television shows set in Los Angeles
Bravo (American TV network) original programming
English-language television shows